Luis "The Eel" Bustamante Anguilla (1880 – death date unknown) was a Cuban baseball shortstop in the Cuban League and Negro leagues. He played from 1901 to 1913 with several ballclubs. He was elected to the Cuban Baseball Hall of Fame in 1939.

Bustamante played in the Negro leagues from 1904 to 1913, spending 1904 and 1906 with the Cuban X-Giants, 1904, 1905 and 1911 with the All Cubans, 1907 with the Brooklyn Royal Giants, and 1906 through 1913 with the Cuban Stars of Havana.

References

External links

1880 births
Year of death missing
Cuban League players
All Cubans players
Almendares (baseball) players
Azul (baseball) players
Brooklyn Royal Giants players
Carmelita players
Club Fé players
Cuban Stars (West) players
Cuban X-Giants players
Habana players
Nuevo Criollo players
Baseball infielders
People from Pinar del Río Province
Cuban expatriate baseball players in the United States